Year 930 (CMXXX) was a common year starting on Friday (link will display the full calendar) of the Julian calendar.

Events 
 By place 

 Europe 
 17 June (traditional date) – The Althing, the parliament of Iceland, is established at þingvellir ("Thing Fields"). Chieftains from various tribes assemble for 2 weeks (at a thing) to settle disputes, arrange marriages, etc.; it continues in existence into the 21st century, as the world's oldest parliament of the Icelandic Commonwealth.
 Bishopwearmouth is formed and settled in England, after Æthelstan grants the lands to the Bishop of Durham.
 Gilbert, Duke of Lorraine besieges Douai in West Francia.

 Arabian Empire 
 Hajj – Qarmatians, led by Abu Tahir al-Jannabi, sack Mecca, desecrating the Zamzam Well, and carrying off the Black Stone.
 Mardavij ibn Ziyar is sent by Asfar ibn Shiruya along with his brother Shirzad, to capture the fortress of Shamiran in Tarom (Northern Iran), the capital of the Sallarid ruler Muhammad ibn Musafir. During the siege Mardavij is persuaded to revolt against Asfar, by letters from Makan ibn Kaki. With the help of the sons of the Sallarid, he kills other members of his tribe, including Shirzad. Mardavij founds the Ziyarid Dynasty and becomes the ruler of Asfar's former territories, which include Rey, Qazvin, Zanjan, Abhar, Qom and Karaj.

 Asia 
 October 16 – Emperor Daigo, being fatally ill, abdicates in favor of his 7-year-old son Suzaku, after a 33-year reign. He enters the Buddhist priesthood, but dies shortly after. Former Emperor Uda (Daigo's father), remains the power behind the Japanese throne (until 931).
 The independent Korean island state of Usan-guk becomes a protectorate of Goryeo.
 Yelü Bei, prince and elder brother of the Khitan Emperor Tai Zong, leaves for China.

Births 
 Alferius, Italian abbot and saint (d. 1050)
 Boleslaus II, duke of Bohemia (d. 999)
 Gisulf I, prince of Salerno (d. 977)
 Herbert of Wetterau, German nobleman (d. 992)
 Lambert of Chalon, Frankish nobleman (d. 978) 
 Liudolf, duke of Swabia (approximate date) (d. 957)
 Mieszko I, prince of Poland (approximate date) (d. 992)
 Nikon the Metanoeite, Byzantine monk (d. 998)
 Odo I, German nobleman (approximate date) (d. 993)
 Ya'qub ibn Killis, Fatimid vizier (d. 991)
 Zhang Mi, Chinese Ci lyric poet (d. unknown)

Deaths 
 May 31 – Liu Hua, princess of Southern Han (b. 896)
 June 19 – Xiao Qing, chancellor of Later Liang (b. 862) 
 June 20 – Hucbald, Frankish monk and music theorist

 October 26 – Li Qi, chancellor of Later Liang (b. 871)
 November 19 – Yan Keqiu, Chinese chief strategist
 December 2 – Ma Yin, Chinese warlord and king (b. 853)
 Amoghavarsha II, ruler of Rashtrakuta (India)
 García II Sánchez, duke of Gascony (approximate date)
 Sharwin II, ruler of the Bavand Dynasty (Iran)
 Xia Luqi, general of Later Tang (b. 882)
 Abū Kāmil Shujāʿ ibn Aslam, Egyptian mathematician (b. )
 Óengus mac Óengusa, Irish poet and Chief Ollam of Ireland

References